The 2012 ASB Classic was a women's tennis tournament played on outdoor hard courts. It was the 27th edition of the ASB Classic, and was part of the WTA International tournaments of the 2012 WTA Tour. It took place at the ASB Tennis Centre in Auckland, New Zealand, from 2 to 8 January 2012.

Singles main-draw entrants

Seeds

1 Rankings as of 26 December 2011

Other entrants
The following players received wildcards into the singles main draw:
  Sacha Jones
  Virginie Razzano
  Magdaléna Rybáriková

The following players received entry from the qualifying draw:
  Jamie Hampton
  Aravane Rezaï
  Alison Riske
  Karolína Plíšková

Withdrawals
  Venus Williams (Sjögren's syndrome disease)

Retirements
  Sabine Lisicki (left abdominal muscle injury)
  Flavia Pennetta (back injury)

Doubles main-draw entrants

Seeds

1 Rankings are as of 26 December 2011

Other entrants
The following pairs received wildcards into the doubles main draw:
  Marina Erakovic /  Rebecca Marino
  Emily Fanning /  Regina Kulikova

Withdrawals
  Sabine Lisicki (left abdominal muscle injury)

Champions

Singles

 Zheng Jie defeated  Flavia Pennetta, 2–6, 6–3, 2–0 retired
It was Zheng's 1st title of the year and 4th of her career.

Doubles

 Andrea Hlaváčková /  Lucie Hradecká defeated  Julia Görges /  Flavia Pennetta 6–7(2–7), 6–2, [10–7]

See also
 2012 Heineken Open – men's tournament

References

External links
Official website

ASB Classic
WTA Auckland Open
ASB
ASB
2012 in New Zealand tennis